Martin Clive Warner  (born 24 December 1958) is an Anglican bishop in England. He is currently the Bishop of Chichester.

Early life and education
Warner was educated at King's School, Rochester, Maidstone Grammar School, and at St Chad's College, University of Durham 1977–80. He then trained for ordination at St Stephen's House, Oxford, later earning a Doctor of Philosophy (PhD) degree at the University of Durham.

Ordained ministry
Assistant Curate at St Peter's, Plymouth (1984–1988) 
Team Vicar of the Parish of the Resurrection, Leicester (1988–1993) 
Administrator of the Anglican Shrine of Our Lady of Walsingham (1993–2002)
Priest in Charge of Hempton with Pudding Norton (1998–2000) 
Honorary Canon of Norwich Cathedral (2000–?) 
Associate Vicar at St Andrew, Holborn (2002–2003)

Warner was a canon residentiary at St Paul's Cathedral, 2003–2009: the canon pastor from 2003 to 2008 and then canon treasurer until 2009.

Episcopal ministry
Warner was consecrated as a bishop in the Church of England at York Minster on 26 January 2010 and then welcomed on 30 January 2010 at St Hilda's Church, Whitby. He suffered a cardiac arrest on 23 August 2010 while on holiday in Florence, but returned to work. From 2008 to 2011, Warner wrote the weekly "Sunday's Readings" column for the Church Times.

On 3 May 2012, Warner's appointment as the next diocesan Bishop of Chichester was announced, his election was confirmed on 2 July and his enthronement took place in Chichester Cathedral on 25 November.

In a compromise by John Sentamu, Archbishop of York, to whom the candidate professed canonical obedience, Warner officiated as principal celebrant in the laying-on of hands and Eucharist for the episcopal consecration of Philip North as suffragan Bishop of Burnley at York Minster on 2 February 2015 (Feast of Candlemas). 

He was introduced to the House of Lords as a Lord Spiritual on 15 January 2018.

Views
On 20 November 2012, Warner was one of three bishops (and one of the two diocesans) in the General Synod who voted against a motion to allow the ordination of women as bishops in the Church of England. His position on the issue has been criticised by some local clergy and parishioners across the Chichester diocese.

He is a member of the Council of Bishops of The Society, an association of traditionalist Anglo-Catholics.

In 2023, following the news that the House of Bishop's of the Church of England was to introduce proposals for blessing same-sex relationships, he signed an open letter which stated:

Styles
The Reverend Martin Warner (1984–2000)
The Reverend Canon Martin Warner (2000–2003)
The Reverend Canon Doctor Martin Warner (2003–2010)
The Right Reverend Doctor Martin Warner (2010–present)

References

1958 births
Living people
People educated at King's School, Rochester
People educated at Maidstone Grammar School
Alumni of St Chad's College, Durham
Alumni of St Stephen's House, Oxford
Bishops of Whitby
Bishops of Chichester
Lords Spiritual
Anglo-Catholic bishops
English Anglo-Catholics
21st-century Church of England bishops